Evelyn Victoria Ann Tate (née Chandler) (1887 – 1979) known by her stage name Eva Carrington, was an actress, model and sometime peeress as the wife of the Baron de Clifford.

Modelling career
Carrington was born Evelyn Chandler in London, the daughter of Anglo-Irish Walter Robert Chandler, a messenger and hall porter at the Walsingham House Hotel, Piccadilly, sometime orderly room clerk to Colonel Fred Burnaby. Her mother, Louisa, was a theatre attendant. By 1891, the family were using "Carrington" as their surname. Her sister, Gladys Winifred Carrington Chandler, married Royal Air Force Flight Lieutenant Christopher Humphrey Tancred (1888-1972), grandson of Sir Thomas Tancred, 7th Baronet, a philanthropist and early colonist of Canterbury, New Zealand; their son was the actor Anthony Tancred (1930-1995).

Carrington was a model for the artist James Whistler between 1898 and 1902. She posed for a number of Whistler's paintings and drawings, including "A dancing woman in a pink robe, seen from the back", "The Tambourine" "Eva and Gladys Carrington seated on a sofa", and "The Bead Stringers".

Stage career
She became a renowned actress during the Edwardian period. A famous role was as one of the Gibson Girls in the British theatre performance of "The Catch of the Season"

Marriages
Eva married Jack Southwell Russell, 25th Baron de Clifford, in February 1906. She adopted the title Lady de Clifford. This marriage, of a commoner and showgirl to a senior peer, created a scandal at the time.

Following her first husband's death, she married Captain Arthur Roy Stock of Glenapp Castle, Ayrshire, in 1913; he died in 1915. In 1922, Eva married George Vernon Tate, grandson of the founder of the Tate Gallery.

She had several children, and the eldest, Edward Southwell Russell, succeeded to the de Clifford barony.

References

External links
 New York Times article on the marriage to Baron de Clifford 
 Biography of Edward Southwell Russell, everything2.com

1887 births
1979 deaths
English female models
English actresses
Actresses from London
de Clifford